In June 2014, the Official Charts Company (OCC) started including audio streams in the official UK Singles Chart, recognising their importance as an indicator of current popular trends and tastes in music. From this point onward, the popularity of a single or album track can be measured by both sales (which include paid downloads) and streams on officially recognised subscription and ad-funded on-demand services. Although the OCC added these figures to the chart in July 2014, they started compiling them in May 2012 through the Official Audio Streaming Chart. They are taken from on-demand audio streaming services such as Spotify, Apple Music, Amazon Music, Deezer and Tidal, all of which are members of the Digital Entertainment and Retail Association (ERA). Video streams were also added in June 2018, with a new weighting system applied to "premium" streams (those on paid subscription services) and "free" streams (those on ad-supported services like YouTube and the free tier of Spotify).

In June 2016, "Sorry" by Justin Bieber became the first song to pass 100 million streams. By September 2016, it had been joined by two other Bieber songs: "Love Yourself" and "What Do You Mean?" as well as "One Dance" by Drake (the first song to achieve 100 million streams in a calendar year).

As of November 2022, the most-streamed song in the UK is "Someone You Loved" by Lewis Capaldi, with over 562 million streams. The song with the most streams in a single chart week is "Easy on Me" by Adele in the week ending 28 October 2021 with 24 million streams, whilst Little Mix hold the record for the most streamed girl group single, "Shout Out to My Ex".

History

In July 2014, the OCC announced that "Pompeii" by Bastille was the most-streamed song in the UK with 26.6 million streams. "Rather Be" by Clean Bandit featuring Jess Glynne was the most-streamed song in 2014 with just short of 40 million streams, whilst "Cheerleader" by OMI was the most-streamed song of 2015 with 71.7 million.

The record for most streams in a week has been broken many times since 2012 when the OCC started measuring it as streaming levels have continued to grow. In 2013, "Get Lucky" by Daft Punk was the first song to achieve 1 million streams in a week, "Uptown Funk" broke the 2 million streams barrier at the end of 2014 and in April 2015, "See You Again" by Wiz Khalifa featuring Charlie Puth passed 3 million streams. In November 2015, "Hello" by Adele almost doubled the record to 7.32 million streams and, in the same week, Bieber also passed 4 million with "Sorry".

In the week ending 4 October 2014, "All About That Bass" by Meghan Trainor became the first single ever to reach the UK top 40 on streams alone before it was available to buy and in the week ending 13 December 2014, "Thinking Out Loud" became the first song to reach number one despite selling less than Union J's "You Got It All", the number-two song, due to streaming.

During 2015, streaming grew with an 80 percent increase in the first half of the year compared with the same period in 2014, with 59 songs being streamed more than 10 million times and 17 more than 20 million times. In total 53.7 billion songs were streamed in the UK in 2015, equating to almost 2,000 songs played in each UK household.

In December 2016, the OCC announced that streaming had grown from 275 million per week in 2014 to 990 million and, consequently, the formula for converting streams to sale equivalents in the singles chart would be changed from 100:1 to 150:1 from January 2017. Additionally, in June 2017, it was decided that after a record has spent at least 10 weeks on the chart, any track which has declined for three consecutive weeks will see its streams:sales ratio change from 150:1 to 300:1, in an attempt to accelerate their disappearance from the chart.

"Shape of You" by Ed Sheeran was the UK's most streamed song from July 2017 until November 2022, when it was overtaken by Lewis Capaldi's "Someone You Loved".

Most-streamed songs

These are the UK's 50 most-streamed songs using data from January 2014 onwards.

See also
 List of most-streamed songs on Spotify

References

External links
Official Audio Streaming Chart at the Official Charts Company

British music industry
Lists of best-selling singles in the United Kingdom